Napier Gap [elevation: ] is a gap in Catoosa County, in the U.S. state of Georgia.

The Napier family kept a store at Napier's Crossroads near this gap that was named for them.

References

Landforms of Catoosa County, Georgia
Valleys of Georgia (U.S. state)